Wonder of Women is a 1929 American pre-Code drama film directed by Clarence Brown and starring Lewis Stone, Leila Hyams, and Peggy Wood. It was nominated for Best Writing at the 2nd Academy Awards.

Based on the 1927 German novel Die Frau des Steffen Tromholt by  Hermann Sudermann, the film is now lost with only sound discs surviving at UCLA.

Cast
Lewis Stone as Stephen Trombolt
Leila Hyams as Karen
Peggy Wood as Brigitte  
Harry Myers as Bruno Heim 
Sarah Padden as Anna
George Fawcett as Doctor
Blanche Friderici as Stephen Trombolt's housekeeper (as Blanche Frederici)
Wally Albright as Wulle-Wulle (as Wally Albright Jr.) 
Anita Louise as Lottie (as Anita Fremault) 
Ullrich Haupt as Kurt

See also
List of rediscovered films

External links

References

1929 drama films
1929 films
American black-and-white films
1920s English-language films
American drama films
Films directed by Clarence Brown
Metro-Goldwyn-Mayer films
Films based on German novels
Films based on works by Hermann Sudermann
Films set in Germany
Films about pianos and pianists
1920s rediscovered films
Films with screenplays by Bess Meredyth
Rediscovered American films
1920s American films